Aspergillus silvaticus is a species of fungus in the genus Aspergillus. It is from the Silvati section. The species was first described in 1955.

Growth and morphology

A. silvaticus has been cultivated on both Czapek yeast extract agar (CYA) plates and Malt Extract Agar Oxoid® (MEAOX) plates. The growth morphology of the colonies can be seen in the pictures below.

References 

silvaticus
Fungi described in 1955